Paris Gibson Square Museum of Art (also known by its acronym, PGSMA) is an art museum located at 1400 First Avenue North in Great Falls, Montana, in the United States.  The building was constructed in 1896 to house the city's first high school, Great Falls High School (later known as Great Falls Central High School).  The high school moved to new quarters in 1931, at which time the building was renamed Paris Gibson Junior High School.  The junior high school vacated the premises in 1975 for a new building. In 1977, Paris Gibson Square Museum of Art was formed, and it took ownership of the building.  It is one of six museums in the city. The structure was listed on the National Register of Historic Places in September 1976.

The museum focuses primarily on contemporary art by artists from the region. Much of its collection consists of folk art, abstract art, postmodern art, and functional artwork such as jewelry. In addition to two floors of galleries, the museum also hosts an outdoor sculpture garden.

The structure should not be confused with the Roman Catholic parochial school also named Great Falls Central High School. This Catholic school opened in 1950 at 2400 Central Avenue. It closed in 1973, and the public school system purchased the building in 1975. The building housed Paris Gibson Junior High School (later Paris Gibson Middle School) from September 1976 to May 2005. Paris Gibson Education Center, an alternative high school, opened in the building in 2007. This building also houses Paris Gibson Middle School Academy, a program for at-risk students.

Great Falls Central High School

Construction
Great Falls was founded in 1883 when businessman Paris Gibson surveyed the city and platted a permanent settlement on the south side of the river. It was incorporated on November 28, 1888. By 1890, Black Eagle Dam had been built within the city limits on the Great Falls of the Missouri River, a meat packing industry (the largest between St. Paul, Minnesota, and Spokane, Washington) had arisen, a railway had come to town, and a silver smelter had been built. The city's public school system was established in 1886.  That year, the city opened the Whittier Building (later known as Whittier Elementary School) and began holding ungraded educational instruction for all students there.

Great Falls High School was founded in the fall of 1890 by the city of Great Falls after four teenage girls (newly arrived in the city) asked to receive a high school public education. The four young women constituted the first class, which met in a corner of a classroom in the Whittier Building (which, by that time, featured instruction in the sixth, seventh, and eighth grades). By September 1892, Great Falls High School was an independent school within the city public school system. Its 23 students also had a specified course of instruction (rather than general classes).

In 1896, the Great Falls Public Schools built the first Great Falls High School building. City voters passed an initiative in 1893 to sell bonds to build a high school, but the Panic of 1893 delayed construction. A design by local architect William White was chosen over three other proposals.

About the high school building
White's Romanesque Revival three-story structure featured a small central circular building, two rectangular wings, and an eight-story, four-faced clock tower. Construction on the building, located at 1400 First Avenue North, began in 1894. The high school was built of gray sandstone obtained from quarries near both Helena and Great Falls. To compact the foundation's backfill, a herd of sheep was driven around the structure 100 times. Wood for the interior supports, roof, and steps were cut from massive trees logged in the Rocky Mountains and floated down the Missouri River.

The finished building featured a tin mansard roof (molded and painted to look like tile), gables, and an attic suspended from the roof joists. Ornate brass doorknobs and hinges were used throughout the building, and heat was supplied by cast iron radiators with delicate, filigreed covers. The building (whose original cost was estimated at $59,940) was completed by McKay Brothers in 1896 at a total cost of $110,000. The structure, which was designed to educate 500 students, contained 14 classrooms, a physical laboratory, a chemical laboratory, an art studio, and an assembly hall that could seat 400. A boiler system was installed in the basement.

A brick annex, designed by architect W.R. Lowery, was constructed against the high school's south side in 1913 at a cost of $200,000. At this time, the boiler system was moved from the basement of the high school to the area between the main building and the annex. An urban legend (which may have begun as early as the 1910s) began to circulate that the old boiler room was turned into a swimming pool, and that a student drowned in the pool—leaving the high school haunted. An investigation in the 1990s revealed that although student Grant Mill from Great Falls High School did drown in 1915, he did not drown in a fictitious pool in the basement but rather in the Missouri River. (Nonetheless, in July 2010, museum executive director Kathy Lear admitted that she once heard ghostly radio music coming from the basement late one afternoon.)

The clock tower was removed in 1916 after its massive weight began to compromise the building.

In 1917, a janitor was permitted to live on the site with his family.  Frank Miles was given $150 and allowed to construct an apartment for himself, his wife, and his five children in the southeast corner of the high school's attic. It is uncertain how many years he and his family lived there.

Use as Paris Gibson Junior High School
Great Falls High School moved into a new building in 1931. In 1927, the Great Falls public school system sought voter approval to issue bonds to build a new high school, but this initiative was defeated. The bond issue was brought before voters again in 1928, and it passed. Construction on a new, $1 million building began in 1928 and continued through 1929.

From 1930 to 1975, the Great Falls High School building housed Paris Gibson Junior High School. The north entrance was closed in the 1940s after the front steps were discovered to be sinking. The driveway in front of this entrance was removed in the 1970s and replaced with sod. The south entrance was used as the main entrance after 1940. In the late 1960s, while repairs to the structure's roof were being made, a student broke into the building and climbed atop the elevator. He rode the elevator to the roof. But he touched a power line as he climbed off the elevator, giving him a severe electrical shock and causing his shirt to catch fire. He survived with minimal injuries. Another accident occurred shortly before the building was closed in the 1970s. A student in the gymnasium (which was housed in the brick annex), attempted to do chin-ups on a water pipe. The pipe snapped, causing the gym to be flooded.

The junior high school vacated the premises in June 1975 for a new building at 2400 Central Avenue. Several local Catholic parishes joined together in the late 1940s to construct a Catholic high school, named Great Falls Central High School.  The low brick, steel, glass, and plaster building, constructed in 1950, occupied half a city block next to the Ursuline Academy. Two large wings were added in 1966.  However, the building closed in 1973 due to lower enrollment, rising costs, and fewer volunteer priests and nuns to act as teachers. The Great Falls Public Schools purchased the structure in 1975 for $1.4 million. It spent another $800,000 renovating the building and adding an industrial arts wing on the southwest corner. Paris Gibson Junior High moved there in 1976 from the old high school building.

The former Great Falls Central High School was listed on the National Register of Historic Places in September 1976.

Paris Gibson Square Museum of Art

Founding and early years
After the departure of Paris Gibson Junior High School from the old Great Falls High School building in June 1975, there was deep concern that the building might be demolished. The building was in disrepair from decades of use as a public school, the HVAC and mechanical systems needed upgrading, and the building was ill-prepared for mothballing. Vandalism, weather, and lack of use quickly began to take its toll, as the building sat vacant for a year. A local coalition of historic preservationists, concerned citizens, and art aficionados quickly formed to save the historic structure. Great Falls had long been home to the C. M. Russell Museum (dedicated to the works of Western artist Charles Marion Russell and others), but there was no institution supporting contemporary artists or art in other genres. The effort to save the historic high school began in 1974, during the citywide debate over whether to purchase the Catholic high school for use as a junior high. Jean Warden Dybdal and Pam Marlen, leaders in the Junior League chapter in Great Falls, organized an informal citizen's task force to come up with a plan to save the high school building. The initial plan was to create a community cultural center, although over time this changed into a more formal museum proposal. The Junior League and its allies successfully pushed the Great Falls Public Schools and Commissioners of Cascade County to sign an agreement whereby the structure became jointly owned by both governmental bodies. Cascade County agreed to provide funding for the structure's renovation and operations. The art museum was tasked with becoming financially self-sustaining. GFPS agreed to lease the structure to the museum for $1 a year, but not pay for any renovations. As part of the agreement with GFPS, the museum also agreed to devote a substantial portion of its resources to educating students and the public about art and art-making.

The Paris Gibson Square Museum of Art (PGSMA) was incorporated as a nonprofit institution in 1976. It was named for Paris Gibson, the city's founder. The museum faced two immediate problems. First, the historic building was climate controlled for the storage or display of perishable art, and lacked storage space. Second, the museum had no collection to display. Renovations began immediately, with community volunteers providing most of the work. Some aspects of the building—such as the highly detailed brass doorknobs and door hinges, the carved door frames, and ornate iron grating over the air vents—were retained. As the Great Falls High School structure was renovated, the museum quickly began acquiring art for display, primarily through donations. In late 1976, it acquired 243 sculptures by Lee Steen, a nationally known folk artist from Roundup, Montana. The museum, unable to display Steen's work, stored it in its attic.

Just prior to the museum's opening, a portion of the structure blew up. The explosion was planned by the producers of the motion picture Telefon. City and GFPS officials agreed that the 1913 brick annex, which was not historic and which marred the southern side of the structure, should be demolished. The film's producers sought permission from the city to film the demolition, which involved ramming the building with a prop Jeep and causing it to explode (saving the city $23,000). The explosives were rigged so that the explosion occurred solely in a southern, eastern, and western direction—away from the historic building.  The museum was undamaged.  However, the explosion was so powerful that it hurled flaming debris onto the rooftops of several nearby homes, causing some damage.

Initially, Cascade County budgeted for the museum's support annually. But in 1993, the county signed an agreement with PGSMA and the Cascade County Historical Society in which the county agreed to give the museum $66,000 a year for building maintenance. Additionally, the county sought voter approval for a mill levy which would generate income to support both the museum and the historical society. Under a formula included in the agreement, PGSMA received slightly more of the mill levy than the historical society.

The Paris Gibson Museum of Art opened its doors in 1977. In its early years, the museum built is collection and upgraded its space to accommodate its mission of displaying contemporary artwork as well as providing classrooms for lectures, art-making, teaching, and performances. Due to the limited size of the collection, the museum leased space to the Cascade County Historical Society, Great Falls Genealogy Society, Junior League, and Montana Wilderness Society. (For a time, The History Museum was also co-located in the structure.) In 1988, curator Mark Leach organized one of the first exhibitions of actor Robert De Niro's artwork. The exhibition debuted at the Everson Museum of Art in Syracuse, New York.

1990s
The museum inaugurated an outdoor sculpture garden in 1993. The first piece to be placed in the garden was Robert Harrison's 1993 "Gibson Gateway". The piece was submitted as part of a statewide competition held by PGSMA, which Harrison won. The brick and masonry work depicts an archway (painted blue) framed by a series of freestand brick walls. The second piece in the sculpture garden was Richard Swanson's "Prairie Tops", added in 2001. The fluted, dreidel-like piece of aluminum (painted yellow) stands near the southeast corner of the building. In 2002, PGSMA commissioned a new work, titled "Two Sisters", from Great Falls High School art teacher Lisa Easton. Funding for the piece came from PGSMA and the Meadowlark Foundation. The sculpture incorporates  of shonkinite (both as gravel and as carved stones of various size on top of the gravel) held by a steel basin flush in the ground. A curving fan of steel pushes through the gravel. Two more pieces were added in 2012.  The first is Theodore Waddell's untitled, undated piece which stands near the building's west entrance. The rectangular piece has an undulating upper surface, and is made of weathering steel (which gives it a brown patina). The other piece was local artist Mike Hollern's untitled, undated piece near the north entrance. This metal work is reminiscent of an upright chipped flint arrowhead with a fish's tail.

Beginning in 1995, PGSMA began a $1.5 million "Centennial Campaign" fund-raising effort to make major improvements to its facility and to begin an endowment. The capital campaign, chaired by Diane Volk (whose father founded Volk Construction, a large building company in the state), surpassed its goal by $170,000 in early 1999. The funds allowed the museum to remove the sod from its north entrance and reinstall a historically accurate circular driveway. Local architectural firm L'Heureux Page Werner designed the new drive and staircase stabilization. The Helena, Montana, firm Dick Anderson Construction performed the stair work. Local construction firm United Materials, Inc. donated the materials for the drive. A commemorative sidewalk of brick, inscribed with the names of major donors to the capital campaign, was added between the staircase and the driveway. In addition to the driveway, all the windows in the building (which leaked significant amounts of air and permitted dust to filter inside) were replaced, the north steps were stabilized and repaired, the HVAC system repaired and made functional, the roof repaired, exhibit space renovated, oak trim throughout the building conserved and refinished, and the building's antique light fixtures restored (improving exhibition lighting dramatically). Historically accurate wooden doors replaced the existing doors, and the plaster in the entrance porticos repaired. The driveway and new stairs opened on September 30, 1999. The restoration effort won a Cascade County Historical Society Preservation Award in February 2000 and a Great Falls/Cascade County Historic Preservation Advisory Commission preservation award in May 2002.

At the same time, the museum made changes to its grounds as well. The museum's Pam Marlen Memorial Garden underwent restoration, with new plantings and signage donated by Tilleraas and Forde (a local plant nursery). A new outdoor children's playground (in the museum's colors) was also constructed adjacent to the building's south entrance. American Renovation and Construction Co. donated materials and labor for the playground.

On December 30, 1999, the prestigious Andy Warhol Foundation for the Visual Arts made a $30,000 grant to PGSMA to support an exhibit of contemporary Native American art, "Material Culture: Innovation in Native Art." Other recipient institutions included the Hirshhorn Museum and Sculpture Garden (part of the Smithsonian Institution), the Museum of Contemporary Art in Los Angeles, and the New Museum of Contemporary Art in New York City.

2000s
2000 proved to be a year of change for the museum. In the spring, the Cascade County Historical Society moved into the International Harvester Building (which was renamed the High Plains Heritage Center), which been undergoing a renovation since 1999. The Great Falls Genealogy Society also moved into the new building, giving PGSMA extensive new space for expansion. But in August 2000, Bonnie Laing-Malcomson resigned as executive director of PGSM to take a job as the executive director of the Oregon College of Art & Craft. Museum curator Jessica Hunter was named interim executive director. In December 2000, PGSMA won a $138,000 grant to remodel the space vacated by the historical and genealogical societies. Three new galleries were planned to display more of the museum's 500 pieces. These included:
Northwest Contemporary Art Gallery
Contemporary Outsider Art Gallery (to house the works of Lee Steen), and
Photography Gallery.
The grant also provided for renovation and equipping of an Educational Resource Room to house games, art history reference materials, and an interactive kiosk about the Steen works, and for renovation of a second-floor room into a gallery to house artwork held by the Great Falls Clinic. The renovated gallery space opened in August 2001 under a collective name, the E.L. Wiegand East Wing Permanent Collection Galleries.

In April 2003, PGSMA hired Lynne Spriggs as its permanent executive director. Spriggs' tenure at the museum, which began in September, proved difficult. PPL Montana, the owner of Black Eagle Dam (a hydroelectric dam located in the county), challenged the amount of property taxes assessed on its dam, protesting 10.87 percent of the $4.48 million 2000 tax assessment, 6.5 percent of the $4.8 million 2001 tax assessment, and 85.65 percent of the $4.96 million 2002 tax assessment. This amounted to 30 percent of the $14.2 million property tax assessment from 2000 to 2003 in the state of Montana—with one-third of the amount owed payable solely in Cascade County. Under severe budgetary stress, the county reduced PGSMA's maintenance budget to $60,720. The county also advised that the mill levy would raise only $157,280 in 2003 (about $22,000 less than the previous year). The historical society asked the county to revise the 1993 agreement so that it would receive more of the mill levy, but the county declined.

In response to the budget cuts, PGSMA implemented an admission fee in June 2003 for the first time in its history. The $2 admission fee applied only to adults who did not participate in the museum's membership program. (Children under 12 were also exempt.) PGSMA also cut its operating budget by 3 percent, slashed its travel and staff training budget by 75 percent, and cancelled its janitorial contract. (Existing staff began handling general custodial duties.) In May 2004, with budget pressures continuing, PGSMA began a new membership drive and fund-raising campaign. New "Patron" and "Benefactor" membership categories were created (with $500 and $2,000 donation categories, roughly double the existing regular membership category). For a limited time, corporate membership in these new categories also provided benefits such as special advertising opportunities. A telephone effort began to offer these new membership categories to people in the county.

PGSMA won two grants in 2004 which helped eased its budget crisis. In June, the Dufresne Foundation awarded the museum a $100,000 grant for its endowment. PGSMA said it would work to find donors willing to match the grant, thereby raising $200,000. In September, the Institute of Museum and Library Sciences (a federal grant-making agency), awarded PGSMA $70,815 to expand its community outreach program.  PGSMA said it would spend another $105,684 to create a combined $176,400 membership and awareness campaign.

In January 2006, Spriggs resigned as executive director of the Paris Gibson Square Museum of Art. Jessica Hunter was again named interim executive director, but she left the museum in June. In July, the museum hired Kathy Lear as its new executive director.  Lear had previously served as the museum's director of development from 1997 to 2002, during which the Centennial Campaign raised $1.7 million. Her tenure at the museum began in September 2006.

The museum's financial condition continued to improve after 2006. The museum received a donation from Pacific Steel & Recycling in November which allowed the museum to waive its now-$5 per person admission fee for the next 12 months. In May 2007, the museum won a $12,382 Community Development Block Grant to add Braille and large-print signage throughout the museum, and to make other improvements which would allow the physically disadvantage to access the museum and its programs more fully. In September 2007, Bob Durden was hired as new museum's curator, replacing Jessica Hunter Larsen. His tenure at the museum began in May 2008. The museum rededicated its Pam Marlen Memorial Garden in July 2008 after raising $45,000 in donations to renovate it. The renovations included the planting of native flowers and the construction of picnic tables. Pacific Steel & Recycling renewed its donation (estimated at about $12,000 a year) to keep the museum admission-free in 2007 and 2008. Museum officials said that the donation and the community outreach campaign increased attendance to 25,801 in 2008, up from 16,676 in 2005.

2010s
The museum continued to receive major donations in 2009, 2010, and 2011. A $90,000 grant from the Institution of Museum and Library Services, received in August 2009, allowed the museum to hire a full-time staff person to document, organize, photograph, and catalog its permanent collection. PGSMA said this information would go online. Pacific Steel & Recycling declined to renew its donation in 2009, but in March 2010 Farmers Union Insurance (a local insurance group) stepped forward to make a donation to keep the museum admission-free in 2010. Farmers Union renewed its donation in 2011. A $2,000 grant in October 2011, received from RBC Foundation-USA, was used to fund educational workshops for high school students. PGSMA said it would link these educational offerings to exhibits at the museum.

Staff turnover plagued the museum in 2011 and 2012. Veteran curator Bob Durden resigned in the fall of 2011. Laura Cotton was hired in March 2012 as his replacement. Executive Director Kathy Lear resigned effective April 5. Tracy Houck was hired full-time as executive director of the museum on November 1, 2012. However, the search for a new executive director was not a timely one. Houck took the reins of PGSMA too late for planning for the museum's popular Christmas Collection art show to begin. The event was cancelled for 2012, although Houck pledged to bring it back in 2013. In December 2012, the museum faced a major facility crisis. PGSMA had been aware since early in 2012 that it needed new boilers to replace its two aged heaters. Some fund-raising had already occurred. But on December 30, one of the museum's two boilers failed, and the second boiler came close to failing. PSGMA applied for an emergency grant from the United States Department of Housing and Urban Development, but the agency argued that block-grant support for city-owned buildings operated by nonprofits did not qualify for the block-grant (which was intended to support public agencies only). there was doubt that the museum would receive it.

About the museum
Paris Gibson Square Museum of Art is housed in a Romanesque Revival building made of grey sandstone.  The museum has three floors, a basement, and an attic.

Seven galleries with display space for paintings, sculpture, and other art forms occupy the first and second floors. A visitor information kiosk is also located on the first floor.  The second floor also houses classroom space, where courses (by the museum and by other groups), performances, lectures, and other educational activities are offered. The basement houses additional classrooms.

The museum's collection focuses on contemporary art from artists who live in Montana, the western United States, and western Canada. In 2000, the museum's collection numbered 500 pieces. Due to the lack of a freight elevator and freight doors, the museum is limited in the size and weight of the pieces it may display.

The classroom space at PGSMA is used primarily for educational offerings. The museum strives to offer programming which is not duplicative of that offered by the Children's Museum of Montana, C.M. Russell Museum, The History Museum, or the Lewis and Clark National Historic Trail Interpretive Center. Two educational programs are especially distinctive. The museum's "Vision, Strength and Access Program" is aimed at at-risk youth; people with mental, physical and developmental challenges; and senior citizens. This program provides these individuals with the opportunity to create art in a setting specifically designed to meet their developmental, educational, emotional, mental, and physical challenges. In addition, the museum's "After School Program" is designed for children in kindergarten through the 12th grade. This program provides a nurturing and safe environment that not only allows children to express their creativity but also develop critical thinking skills. Both programs are free. In addition to educational offerings, the museum also allows use of its classrooms for community events, meetings, and private events.

The museum hosts a small outdoor sculpture garden, and maintains the Pam Marlen Memorial Garden (which has seating for outdoor dining).

In addition to art galleries and classroom space, museum amenities include a gift shop and spaces that can be rented for special events.

The museum had roughly 29,000 visitors in 2010. Since 1977, PGSMA has hosted a mid-November event known as Christmas Collection. The three-day event features arts and crafts from local artists, each of whom must apply to be in the show. According to museum officials, it is the largest arts and crafts show in the city. Tickets ($25 in 2011) are required in order to gain access to the show. Items range in price from $1 to $1,000, and the event raises $20,000 to $40,000 a year for the museum. Beginning in 1998, the museum also began hosting an annual art auction and benefit dinner each February.

The museum also hosts art shows. The most important of these is Art Equinox, inaugurated in 1985 and held every two years.  The juried art show invites contemporary artists from 12 states in the Western United States to submit photographs of their recent work for display at PGSMA.

Governance and staff
The museum is governed by a self-perpetuating 14-member board of directors. The board elects from among its members a president, vice president, secretary, and treasurer. It is unclear whether board members have a term of office, or serve until resignation/death.

The museum has a small staff. It includes six full-time staff (Executive Director, Curator of Art, Curator of Education, and three others), and four part-time staff.

Executive Directors
Below is a partial list of Executive Directors of the Paris Gibson Museum of Art.

Bonnie Laing-Malcomson (March 1994 to August 2000)
Jessica Hunter (interim, August 2000 to August 2003)
Lynne Spriggs (September 2003 to January 2006)
Jessica Hunter Larsen (interim, January 2006 to June 2006)
Kathy Lear (September 2006 to April 2012)
Tracy Houck (November 2012 to August 2019)
Sarah Justice (interim, August 2019 to December 2019, [hired full-time], December 2019 to present)

References

Bibliography
Alberta-Montana Heritage Partnership. Alberta-Montana Discovery Guide: Museums, Parks and Historic Sites. Edmonton: The Partnership, 1997.
Baumler, Ellen. Montana Chillers: 13 True Tales of Ghosts and Hauntings. Helena, Mont.: Farcountry Press, 2009.
Bureau of Agriculture, Labor and Industry. Seventh Report of the Bureau of Agriculture, Labor and Industry for the year ended November 30, 1900. Helena, Mont.: Independent Publishing Co., 1900.
Federal Writers' Project. Montana: A State Guide Book. Washington, D.C.: Federal Works Agency, Work Projects Administration, 1939.
National Park Service. The National Register of Historic Places. Washington, D.C.: U.S. Government Printing Office, 1976.
Robison, Ken. Cascade County and Great Falls. Mount Pleasant, S.C.: Arcadia Publishing, 2011.
Small, Lawrence F. Religion in Montana: Pathways to the Present. Billings, Mont.: Rocky Mountain College, 1992.
Superintendent of Public Instruction. Biennial Report of the Superintendent of Public Instruction. Vol. II.  Montana Department of Public Instruction. Helena, Mont.: Independent Publishing Co., 1903.

External links

 Paris Gibson Square Museum of Art official Web site

School buildings on the National Register of Historic Places in Montana
Museums in Great Falls, Montana
Public high schools in Montana
Buildings and structures in Great Falls, Montana
Romanesque Revival architecture in Montana
Schools in Cascade County, Montana
Art galleries established in 1977
Contemporary art galleries in the United States
1977 establishments in Montana
Art museums and galleries in Montana
National Register of Historic Places in Cascade County, Montana